Pingbeinine is a steroidal alkaloid isolated from Fritillaria.

External links
 Two new steroidal alkaloids from Fritillaria ussuriensis

Steroidal alkaloids